"Gone Country" is a song written by Bob McDill and recorded by American country music artist Alan Jackson. It was released in November 1994 as the third single from his fourth studio album, Who I Am. As with that album's first two singles ("Summertime Blues" and "Livin' on Love"), "Gone Country" reached the top of the Billboard Hot Country Singles & Tracks (now Hot Country Songs) charts, a position that it held for one week.

Content
"Gone Country" served as a commentary on the country music scene, illustrating three examples of other singers (a lounge singer in Las Vegas from Long Island, New York; a folk rocker in Greenwich Village; and a "serious composer schooled in voice and composition" who lives in the San Fernando Valley), all of whom find that their respective careers are failing, and as a result, they decide to begin performing country music instead. Alan Jackson said about the song: "Bob McDill wrote this and he is one of my favorite writers of all time. When I first heard this song I fell in love with it. I wish that I'd written it cause it says a lot of things that I'd like to say. I think it's just a fun song actually, celebrating how country music has become more widespread and accepted by all types of people all over the country."

Critical reception
Deborah Evans Price, of Billboard magazine reviewed the song favorably, saying that it was "the most talked-about country song of the year, and deservedly so." She goes on to say that it is "an ode to all the carpetbaggers flowing into Music City. Musically, it kicks ass."

Music video
The video was directed by Michael Oblowitz, and filmed in New York City atop 622 3rd Avenue, as well as in Knoxville, Tennessee, and Las Vegas. The concert scenes in the video were shot in Evansville, Indiana, at Roberts Municipal Stadium, and in Knoxville. It features the former World Trade Center Towers in a flyover.

Chart positions

Year-end charts

Parodies
Jackson himself adopted the tune in commercials for the Ford Motor Company in the late 1990s, titling the track "Ford Country."
American country music parody artist Cledus T. Judd released a parody of "Gone Country" titled "Gone Funky" on his 1995 album Cledus T. Judd (No Relation).
The comedy podcast PolitiPod released a parody about a supporter of Donald Trump titled "Gone Trumpin'" in their 2020 "Minisode #3."

References

1994 singles
1994 songs
Alan Jackson songs
Songs written by Bob McDill
Song recordings produced by Keith Stegall
Arista Nashville singles